Groß Niendorf is a municipality in the district of Segeberg, in Schleswig-Holstein, Germany.

Notable people 

 Christian Rohlfs (1849-1938), German painter

Points of interest

References

Municipalities in Schleswig-Holstein
Segeberg